Hafiat Al-Kadamain is the sixteenth album by Kadim Al Sahir, released on June 29, 2003. The album contains the international successful single "The War Is Over", featuring Sarah Brightman.

Track listing

External links
Kadim Al-Sahir: Ila Tilmitha album at eworldrecords.com

2003 albums
Arabic-language albums
Kadim Al Sahir albums